Ten Mile Creek is a stream in Macon and Shelby counties of Missouri. It is a tributary of the North Fork Salt River.

The source area for the stream is in eastern Macon County east of Missouri Route K between Ten Mile and Redman. The stream flows east-southeast and is impounded in western Shelby County as Daniel Boone Lake north of Clarence on U.S. Route 36. The stream passes under Missouri Route 151 below the dam and continues to the east for about five miles to its confluence with the North Fork.

See also
List of rivers of Missouri

References

Rivers of Macon County, Missouri
Rivers of Shelby County, Missouri
Rivers of Missouri